The Royal Navy Observer School grew out of HM Naval Seaplane Training School at RNAS Lee-on-Solent as a result of a series of changes of identity and parent unit.  From 1918 until 1939 the Royal Air Force was responsible for naval aviation, including training and provision of aircrew to the Royal Navy.  With the return of naval aviation to the Royal Navy on 24 May 1939, the Observer School was established as 750 Naval Air Squadron of the Fleet Air Arm.  During World War II the squadron moved to Trinidad to continue training aircrew. It was temporarily disbanded in October 1945. The squadron reformed in 1952 and is currently based at RNAS Culdrose, where it trains approximately 30 Royal Navy observers every year.

History
The Royal Navy established HM Naval Seaplane Training School on 30 July 1917 at Lee-on-Solent; the unit was responsible for the training of seaplane pilots and observers.  When the Royal Naval Air Service and the Royal Flying Corps merged on 1 April 1918 to form the Royal Air Force, the school was renamed No. 209 Training Depot.

Throughout the early 1920s pilots and observers of seaplanes were trained at Lee-on-Solent under a variety of names; from 1921 the base was renamed the RAF Seaplane Training School, and from 1923, the RAF School of Naval Co-operation.  Although the school now concentrated on observer training, from 1925 all naval aircrew were provided by the RAF, and training of naval officers as observers ceased.  During this period the primary training aircraft was the Fairey IIID.

From 1932 Lee-on-Solent was provided with a full airfield and became the headquarters of the RAF's Coastal Command. Observer training continued apace and the airfield was home to a wide range of naval aircraft including Fairey Seals, Hawker Ospreys, Blackburn Sharks, Supermarine Walruses, and Fairey Swordfishes. Telegraphist air gunners were also trained at Lee-on-Solent in the years leading up to the Second World War.
750 Naval Air Squadron was formed at RNAS Ford on 24 May 1939 from the Royal Navy Observer School, but after Ford was bombed early in the war, it moved to RNAS Yeovilton.  Changing title from a school to a squadron did not change its basic purpose, which was the training of observers for the Fleet Air Arm. The squadron initially flew Hawker Ospreys and Blackburn Sharks, but in November 1940 it moved to Piarco Savannah (HMS Goshawk) in Trinidad and at about the same time re-equipped with Fairey Albacores.

On 15 January 1941, 21 officers and 121 ratings from 749, 750 and 752 squadrons sailed from Liverpool on  bound for Trinidad. There were no survivors.

The squadron operated in Trinidad for the duration of World War II and was disbanded on 10 October 1945. The squadron reformed on 17 April 1952 at RNAS St Merryn.  At first it was equipped with twelve Fairey Barracudas and four Avro Ansons, but in 1953 the Fairey Firefly T7 and Percival Sea Prince T1 aircraft were introduced, and in the same year the squadron moved to RNAS Culdrose.  In 1955 the squadron changed its name to the Observer and Air Signal School.  After discontinuing the training of air telegraphists, it changed again to the Observer School in May 1959.

The squadron moved to Hal Far (HMS Falcon), Malta in October 1959, and in 1965 it was transferred again, this time to RNAS Lossiemouth. The last move came in 1972, back to RNAS Culdrose, still equipped with the Sea Prince T1. These were replaced by the Jetstream T2 in 1978 and in 1992 the squadron became the first naval air squadron to achieve 50 unbroken years in commission. (Note in 2017 now 75!).

Current role
Formerly flying the T2 & T3 versions of the BAe Jetstream, 750 NAS is tasked with providing Basic Flying Training for the Fleet Air Arm's observers. After undergoing initial training at Britannia Royal Naval College, trainee aircrew officers join for a seven-month period of training in all aspects of airborne navigation, airmanship and other tactical skills. This is conducted in classrooms as well as in the air and in a computer-controlled simulator. Upon completion of this course they will be ready for advanced flying training and will be streamed for their eventual specialisation.

On completion of flying training observers serve in Wildcat HMA2 or Merlin HM2 helicopters. These aircraft help extend the eyes and ears of the fleet at sea and are integral to the ASuW and ASW capabilities of the RN

In 2011, the Jetstreams were replaced by Avenger T1 aircraft, modified Beechcraft King Air 350ERs, as part of the UK Military Flying Training System. The Squadron operates four commercially owned but military-registered aircraft, employing a mixture of military and civilian personnel to achieve the instructional task. As well as training Fleet Air Arm observers, it also trains Royal Air Force Mission Aircrew Officers and Non-commissioned Mission Aircrew.

Aircraft flown
Since 1939 705 NAS has flown 13 types of aircraft:

 Blackburn Shark II
 Fairey Albacore I
 Fairey Barracuda II & TR3
 North American Harvard
 Avro Anson I
 Percival Sea Prince T1
 Fairey Firefly T7
 Airspeed Oxford I
 de Havilland Sea Vampire T22
 de Havilland Sea Venom FAW21 & FAW22
 de Havilland Sea Devon C20
 Handley Page (later BAe) Jetstream T2 & T3
 Beechcraft Avenger T1

References

Citations

Bibliography

External links

700 series Fleet Air Arm squadrons
Military units and formations established in 1939
Military of the United Kingdom in Cornwall
Military units and formations of the Royal Navy in World War II
Naval aviation education